Montholon may refer to:

Places
Montholon, a commune in the Yonne department, France
Square Montholon, a square in Paris, France

People
Albine de Montholon (1779-1848), French noblewoman
Charles Tristan, marquis de Montholon (1783-1853), French general
Charles-François-Frédéric, marquis de Montholon-Sémonville (1814-1886), French politician and diplomat